The 2013 WAFL season was the 129th season of the various incarnations of the West Australian Football League (WAFL). It saw long-time rivals West Perth and East Perth both play in their first Grand Final for more than a decade after a long series of finals failures in between. Claremont for the second time won four consecutive minor premierships but failed in both their finals.

Preseason

Home and away season

Round 1

Round 2

Round 3

Round 4

Round 5

Round 6

Round 7

Round 8

State game

Round 9

Round 10

Round 11

Round 12

Round 13

Round 14

Round 15

Round 16

Round 17

Round 18

Round 19

Round 20

Round 21

Round 22

Round 23

Round 24

Ladder

Finals

References

External links
2013 Season results on Australian Football
Official WAFL website

West Australian Football League seasons
WAFL